Djebel Zaghouan is a mountain and the highest point in Eastern Tunisia at 1,295 m. The mountain is located in an area of a National Park.

The town of Zaghouan is located below on its northern slope. The mountain is the site of a Roman temple known as the Temple des Eaux (Temple of Water), which marks the site of an aqueduct which used to take water to the city of Carthage over 100 km away.

The summit route

(5–8 hours, hard)

The ascent 

Follow signs to the ‘Temple des Eaux’ through the town. Continue past the temple on a road winding up the mountain to higher regions. Keep driving along this steep road for just over 10 kilometres until you reach a big white building on your left (Sidi Bougabrine). From here you should be able to see the summit fairly clearly to the south-south-east.

Leading straight to the summit is a fairly steep ridge. Walk back along the road (from the building) for a kilometre until you are where the road intersects the ridge that is now to the south-east below a small rock face. There is also a parking space here but probably only big enough for 2 cars.

From this point, (36°21’54 N; 10°06’13 E) leave the road and head up south-east onto the ridge. There is no path and pushing through undergrowth may be tricky. Some scrambling will also be involved. Once having gained the ridge, it is a fairly straightforward scramble to the top. Just continue along the top of the ridge until you run out of mountain!

The route is arduous, and the terrain is very rocky or overgrown. Expect some tricky scrambling and exposure near the summit. 
When you reach the top (under 3 hours for a group of fit people), you will see that there are actually two peaks, the further one is barely higher than the first, but is the true summit.

The descent 

Drop southwest off the summit, following a large gulley, but staying on the western shoulder. This descent is particularly steep and frustrating, as the rocks are too large to scree glissade, while small enough to easily twist an ankle.

Keep going southwest down this shoulder until it starts flattening out, (36°21’03 N; 10°06’22 E) you then come across a series of old mining excavations. Some are deep shafts delving into the belly of the mountain. Please proceed with caution as these have not been used for a long time. Past the mine shafts where the shoulder widens out and flattens (dotted with a few trees), head southwest off the end of the shoulder (36°20’58 N; 10°06’11 E) below a buttress of rock and you should find an old mining track (keep a good eye out as this is not very visible).

Follow this track heading north along the southern flank of the ridge you ascended for over ½ a kilometre. Keep an eye out on the left for a drinking pool for livestock in the valley below. Leave the track and head down towards this.

Once there look northwest for another trail; follow it (passing some old mining buildings 500m from the pool: 36°21’30N; 10°06’04) until it starts running parallel to the road. Drop off the track onto the road or follow it further and pop out a few minutes later.

Directions

From Tunis

1- Head south along the Trans-African Highway

2- Take the exit onto the C 36 following signs to Zaghouan

3- After 40 kilometers, entering the town of Zaghouan, turn left onto the C 28

4- After over a kilometer, turn right onto avenue 7 Novembre.

5- Follow signs to the Temple des Eaux

Appearance in Literature 

The temple is the subject of a posthumous poem, Temple and Fountain at Zagwhan, by Letitia Elizabeth Landon to illustrate a plate, which appeared in Fisher's Drawing Room Scrap Book, 1841.

Gallery

References

Zaghouan